Marble Mountains ("five elements mountains") is a cluster of five marble and limestone hills located in Ngũ Hành Sơn District, south of Da Nang city in Vietnam. The five mountains are named after the five elements: Kim (metal), Thuy (water), Moc (wood), Hoa (fire) and Tho (earth).

All of the mountains have cave entrances and numerous tunnels, and it is possible to climb to the summit of Mount Thuy. Several Buddhist sanctuaries can also be found within the mountains, making this a tourist destination.

The area is known for stone sculpture making and stone-cutting crafts. Direct rock extraction from the mountains was banned recently. Materials are now being transported from quarries in Quảng Nam Province.

Marble Mountains was officially given the National Special Relic certificate by the Ministry of Culture, Sports and Tourism on January 20, 2019.

Vietnam War 

The mountains were very near the American Marble Mountain Air Facility during the Vietnam War. According to William Broyles Jr., the Marble Mountains contained a hospital for the Vietcong, probably within earshot of the American air field and Da Nang Beach (which bordered the air field on the side opposite the mountains). He describes the enemy as having been so "certain of our ignorance [...] that he had hidden his hospital in plain sight".

Buddhist and Hindu grottoes
The Marble Mountains are home to several Buddhist and Hindu grottoes. A stairway of 156 steps leads to the summit of Thuy Son, the only Marble Mountain accessible to visitors. It allows a wide panoramic view of the surrounding area and the other marble mountains. There are a number of grottoes, including Huyen Khong and Tang Chon, and many Hindu and Buddhist sanctuaries, the temples of Tam Thai, Tu Tam and Linh Ung, and the pagoda of Pho Dong. The sanctuaries feature statues and relief depictions of religious scenes carved out of the marble.

References

Mountain ranges of Vietnam
Landforms of Da Nang
Buddhist caves in Vietnam
Tourist attractions in Vietnam